12696 Camus, provisional designation , is a carbonaceous background asteroid from the central region of the asteroid belt, approximately 9 kilometers in diameter.

It was discovered on 26 September 1989, by Belgian astronomer Eric Elst at ESO's La Silla Observatory in northern Chile, and named after French Nobel Prize laureate in literature Albert Camus.

Classification and orbit 

Camus is a non-family asteroid from the main belt's background population. It orbits the Sun in the central asteroid belt at a distance of 2.2–3.0 AU once every 4 years and 3 months (1,551 days). Its orbit has an eccentricity of 0.14 and an inclination of 8° with respect to the ecliptic. The asteroid's observation arc begins with its discovery, as no precoveries were taken and no identifications were made before 1989.

Naming 

This minor planet was named after French philosopher, author, and journalist, Albert Camus (1913–1960), who received the Nobel Prize in Literature in 1957.

Camus is best known for his novels L'Etranger (The Stranger) and La Peste (The Plague). His main interests were justice, ethics, and politics. As a liberal humanist, he was against the doctrines of Christianity as well as Marxism. The approved naming citation was published by the Minor Planet Center on 20 March 2000.

Physical characteristics 

Camus has been characterized as a carbonaceous C-type asteroid by Pan-STARRS photometric survey.

Lightcurves 

In October 2006, a rotational lightcurve of Camus was obtained from photometric observations by Julian Oey at the Leura Observatory in Australia. The lightcurve rendered a rotation period of  hours with a brightness amplitude of 0.40 in magnitude.

Diameter and albedo 

According to NASA's Wide-field Infrared Survey Explorer with its subsequent NEOWISE mission, Camus has an albedo of 0.07 and 0.13 with a corresponding diameter of 9.3 and 7.7 kilometers, respectively. The Collaborative Asteroid Lightcurve Link assumes a standard albedo for carbonaceous asteroids of 0.057 and calculates a larger diameter of 11.1 kilometer with an absolute magnitude of 13.5.

References

External links 
 Asteroid Lightcurve Database (LCDB), query form (info )
 Dictionary of Minor Planet Names, Google books
 Asteroids and comets rotation curves, CdR – Observatoire de Genève, Raoul Behrend
 Discovery Circumstances: Numbered Minor Planets (10001)-(15000) – Minor Planet Center
 
 

012696
Discoveries by Eric Walter Elst
Named minor planets
19890926